Sport is a significant aspect of the Brisbane lifestyle. Activities range from the occasional international event, annual competitions, competitive leagues and individual recreational pursuits.

Across the city there are 20 public swimming pools, many kilometres of dedicated bikeways, ovals and other sports venues. The city's major stadiums and sporting venues include the Gabba (a 42,000 seat round stadium at Woolloongabba), Lang Park (a 52,500 seat rectangular stadium at Milton also known by its corporate name Suncorp Stadium), Ballymore Stadium, the Queensland Sport and Athletics Centre, the Sleeman Centre (swimming), the State Tennis Centre, the Eagle Farm Racecourse and the Doomben Racecourse.

Rugby league is popular in Brisbane and the city hosts the Brisbane Broncos, who play in the National Rugby League competition and the Queensland Maroons who play in the State of Origin series. In rugby union the city hosts the Queensland Reds who play in the Super Rugby competition. Cricket is popular in the Brisbane and the city hosts the Brisbane Heat who play in the Big Bash League and the Queensland Bulls who play in the Sheffield Shield and the Ryobi One Day Cup.

Brisbane also hosts Delta Gymnastics, along with an A-League soccer team, the Brisbane Roar FC; an Australian Football League team, the Brisbane Lions; a basketball team, the Brisbane Bullets; a baseball team, the Brisbane Bandits; a netball team, the Queensland Firebirds; a field hockey team, the Brisbane Blaze; and water polo teams the Brisbane Barracudas and Queensland Breakers.

Popular sports

Rugby league is the most popular spectator sport in Brisbane. In 2006 565,898 people attended first class rugby league matches at Suncorp Stadium. Other popular spectator sports include Cricket, Football (soccer), Australian rules football, rugby union and basketball. The martial arts are also popular in Brisbane, with the more traditional western combative disciplines and also because of the proximity to Asian countries where the arts are historically based. While participation rates are high it tends not to enjoy the profile of traditional Australia sports, though the olympic sports of boxing, judo and taekwondo are more well known. For the Asian arts there are many places to practice in Brisbane.

Teams in national competitions

Semi-Professional Sport Teams

Attendance figures

2011

2007

2006

2005

Sports venues

Suncorp Stadium
Suncorp Stadium in Milton is nicknamed 'The Cauldron' and is the spiritual home of Rugby League in Brisbane. It is the home of Queensland Rugby League, the Brisbane Broncos (Rugby league), the Queensland Roar (Football (soccer)), the Queensland Reds (Rugby Union) and the annual State of Origin rugby league clash between Queensland (the Maroons) and New South Wales (the Blues). Lang Park became Suncorp Stadium in 1994 after Suncorp became naming rights sponsor. Individual players and officials face stiff fines if they accidentally publicly refer to the venue by its former name, Lang Park.

Brisbane Cricket Ground (the Gabba)

The Gabba hosts domestic and international cricket matches, as well as Australian rules football. Home of the Queensland Bulls (Cricket) and the Brisbane Lions (Australian rules football), the Gabba hosted Olympic football matches for the Sydney 2000 Olympics and was the site of the famous tied test of 1960 between the West Indies and Australia.  Teams based there include: Queensland Bulls (Cricket) and Brisbane Lions (Australian rules football).

Queensland Sport and Athletics Centre (QSAC)
The Queensland Sport and Athletics Centre (QSAC), formerly known as QEII ('QE2') Stadium and later ANZ Stadium, at Nathan is the third largest sporting arena in Queensland. The stadium was built as a temporary venue for the 1982 Commonwealth Games but endured as home for the Brisbane Broncos rugby league team during the 1990s and hosted the 2001 Goodwill Games.

Brisbane Exhibition Ground
The Brisbane Exhibition Ground (also known as the RNA Showgrounds) is the home ground of the Australian Baseball League team the Brisbane Bandits between November and February. It also hosts the Brisbane Ekka that takes place every August. It has also been the home to Cricket, Rugby league, Australian rules football and Speedway style Motor Racing.

Ballymore
Ballymore Stadium is the home of Rugby union in Brisbane, and is the former home of the Queensland Reds (who play in the Super Rugby Pacific competition) who moved to Suncorp Stadium and the Ballymore Tornadoes, the local Australian Rugby Championship entrant before the competition folded. It also plays host to Brisbane Premier Rugby finals, and was once home to the Brisbane Strikers soccer club.

Oxenham Park
Located in Nundah, Oxenham Park has been the home ground of Toombul District Cricket Club – who play in the Brisbane Premier Cricket competition – since 1892. Oxenham Park was also the original home ground of Norths Devils from 1933–1969, before they moved to Bishop Park, also in Nundah.

Perry Park
Perry Park is the spiritual home of Football (soccer) in Brisbane, and is home to the Brisbane Strikers, who play in the local Brisbane competition after being unsuccessful in their A-League bid.

Other sports grounds
 Brisbane Convention & Exhibition Centre – team based there: Brisbane Bullets (Basketball)
 Langlands Park— team based there: Easts Tigers (Rugby league)
 Sleeman Centre – team based there: Queensland Firebirds (Netball)
 Downey Park, located in Windsor, is a major location for field hockey and netball games, particularly for school groups and clubs.
 Lakeside Park located at Dakabin and used for Motor racing.
 Langlands Park located at Stones Corner.
 Purtell Park located at Bardon
 Queensland State Equestrian Centre – equestrian sport venue located in Caboolture
 Queensland Tennis Centre
 Victoria Park – an enormous-size park, which contains tennis courts, the Centenary swimming pool, a golf course and a sports ground.
 Walton Bridge Reserve, located at The Gap, contains sporting fields and skateboard area

Sports events
1982 Commonwealth Games are held in Brisbane
1987 Pan Pacific Swimming Championships
Hosted three matches of the 1992 Cricket World Cup
2000 Olympic football matches during Sydney Olympics
2001 Goodwill Games are held in Brisbane
2003 Hosted matches during Rugby World Cup, including a quarter-final
2009 Brisbane hosts the 2009 Indoor Cricket World Cup, with Australian teams winning in all divisions
2011 Brisbane hosts the Australian Masters Nationals Championships, 21–24 April.  Cross Country hosted by Thompson Estate Athletics at Minnippi Parklands.
2011 Super Rugby Final Queensland Reds vs Canterbury Crusaders
Annual Brisbane Cricket Ground (Gabba) Test Cricket match
Annual Rugby League State of Origin football series at Suncorp Stadium
 Besides spectator sport and sports teams, Brisbane hosts several mass participation events each year, including the Bridge to Brisbane fun run (held this year in September) and the Brisbane Marathon in August each year.

Highlights
 1960 – the Brisbane Cricket Ground the Test match between Australia and the West Indies ended with a tie on 14 December 1960.  It was the first Tied Test in the history of cricket.
 1980 – the first ever Rugby League State of Origin match was held in Brisbane at Lang Park, with the Maroons winning 20–10.
 1982 – the Commonwealth Games, which were held at QEII Stadium and other sports venues in Brisbane, were very successful.  The Commonwealth Games were opened by Duke of Edinburgh, and were closed by Queen Elizabeth II.  The mascot for the Commonwealth Games was  Matilda, a giant-sized 13-metre high mechanical kangaroo who winked at the spectators.
 1997 – the Brisbane Broncos won the Super League premiership at ANZ Stadium in front of more than 58,000 people. It was the first (and to this day, only) Australia-wide Rugby League Grand Final held outside of Sydney.
 2011 – the Queensland Reds win their first Super Rugby in front of yet another capacity crowd at Suncorp Stadium
2021 - Queensland Reds win fourth Super Rugby title in front of capacity crowd

Notable Brisbane-born sportspeople 
Brisbane is the birthplace of many well-known and famous sportsmen and sportswomen.

Basketball
Brad Williamson

Boxing
Jeff Horn

Cricket
Michael Kasprowicz – Nathan Rimmington – Chris Simpson – Andrew Symonds – Andy Bichel

Cycling
Robbie McEwen – Ryan Guettler

Motorsport
Scott Dixon – Dick Johnson

Rugby league
Shaun Berrigan – Wally Lewis – Darren Lockyer – Allan Langer

Rugby union
John Eales – Elton Flatley – Will Genia – James Horwill – Gordon Bray – Digby Ioane – Peter Grigg – David Campese – Michael Lynagh – Tim Horan -Tate McDermott - Quade Cooper

Swimming
Jodie Henry – Alice Mills – Susie O'Neill – Kieren Perkins – Stephanie Rice – Samantha Riley – Giaan Rooney – Jessicah Schipper

Soccer
Craig Moore

Tennis
Samantha Stosur

See also

History of soccer in Brisbane, Queensland
Sport in Queensland
Sports on the Gold Coast, Queensland
Sport in Sydney

References